is a list published in the Japanese magazine Shūkan Bunshun (the Weekly Bunshun)  in 1985 by Bungeishunjū. This list was also published in book form in 1986.

508 people who love mystery novels, including the 123 members of Mystery Writers of Japan, took part in the survey.

The revised edition came out in 2012.

See also 
 Kono Mystery ga Sugoi!
 Honkaku Mystery Best 10
 Japanese detective fiction
 The Top 100 Crime Novels of All Time

References 

Tozai Mystery Best 100 (Revised Edition 2012), The Top 50 Translated Mystery Novels 
Tozai Mystery Best 100 (Revised Edition 2012), The Top 50 Japanese Mystery Novels

External links
 Blogpost listing original 1985 Best 100 translated mystery novels and revised 2012 Best 50 translated mystery novels
 Blogpost listing revised 2012 Best 10 Japanese mystery novels, also listing others in Best 100 Japanese mystery novels which have been translated into English

Mystery fiction
Top book lists
Lists of novels